The battles of Ruona and Salmi was fought between Swedish and Russian troops on 1–2 September 1808 at Ruona and Salmi, Kuortane. The Swedish army was led by Carl Johan Adlercreutz with 4,700–5,000 men under his command against the Russian army of 7,000–7,700 men under the command of Nikolay Kamensky. The battle turned up to be a major engagement in the war where fierce artillery fire occurred from both sides. The Swedes, who were in a well-fortified position, retreated after a while with a loss of 170 killed, 400 wounded and 110 captured according to Adlercreutz, in addition several hundred men had fallen ill. The Russians lost 128 killed, 648 wounded and 51 captured (excluding 18 officers) according to their own estimates. This battle is considered one of the turning points in the Finnish War along with the battle of Oravais.

Citations and sources

Citations

Sources

Ruona
Ruona 1808
Ruona
Ruona
History of South Ostrobothnia
1808 in Sweden
September 1808 events